Oliva pica is a species of sea snail, a marine gastropod mollusk in the family Olividae, the olives.

Description

Distribution
This species occurs in the Indian Ocean off Mauritius and the Seychelles.

References

 Sargent D.M. & Petuch E.J. (2012) A new species of Oliva (Gastropoda: Olividae) from Mauritius, Mascarene Islands. Visaya 3(5): 4–10.

pica
Gastropods described in 1840